Lord Clifford may refer to:
Baron Clifford
Baron Clifford of Chudleigh
Baron de Clifford